Rhyacia simulans, the dotted rustic, is a moth of the family Noctuidae. The species was first described by Johann Siegfried Hufnagel in 1766. It is found in most of Europe, south to Morocco, Algeria and Tunisia, east to Turkey, the Caucasus, Tomsk and Minusinsk.

Technical description and variation

The wingspan is 45–60 mm. It is like Epipsilia latens Hbn. but larger; the forewing paler, the stigmata with distinct pale and dark outlines. pyrophila Schiff. is ochreous grey; suffusa Tutt is darker, the forewing being blackish grey; —latens Stph. is unicolorous black, with still more intense markings.

Biology
Adults are on wing from June to September.

Larva dark brown; the subdorsal area brownish-tannish peach; dorsal line thin, pale, edged with black; a row of dorsal V-shaped marks; an interrupted white lateral stripe.

The larvae feed on Gramineae, Rumex and Taraxacum species.

References

External links

 Taxonomy
Lepiforum e.V.
De Vlinderstichting 

Noctuinae
Moths of Europe
Moths of Asia
Moths described in 1766
Taxa named by Johann Siegfried Hufnagel